Habaek is the Goguryeo god of the Amnok River or, according to an alternative interpretation, the sun god Haebak. According to legend, his daughter Yuhwa married Haemosu and gave birth to Jumong, the founder of Goguryeo.

Mythological overview
Habaek, the god of the Amnok River, had three daughters: Yuhwa, Wuihwa, and Hweonhwa. The eldest of his daughters, Yuhwa, was confronted by Hae Mo-su while she was bathing in a river, and eventually she married him without her father's permission. Outraged by the act, Yuhwa's father challenged Hae Mosu to a duel of metamorphosis.
   
Habaek transformed into a carp, a deer, and a quail, only to be caught by Hae Mo-su when he transformed into an otter, a wolf, and a hawk respectively. Defeated and recognizing Hae Mo-su's supremacy, Habaek consented to the marriage.

However, after the official marriage ceremony was held, Yuhwa escaped Hae Mo-su's chariot before they could ascend to heaven and she returned to her father. Because his daughter's actions brought disgrace to him, Habaek had his lips stretched out and he exiled her to a stream in Dongbuyeo, condemning her to a mortal life.  Yuhwa was later freed by fishermen, who brought her to the local king, Geumwa, and she later gave birth to Jumong.

In popular culture
 Portrayed by Nam Joo-hyuk in the 2017 tvN Monday-Tuesday drama The Bride of Habaek.

See also
 Hebo

References 

Goguryeo
Korean mythology